IFAF Europe is the governing body of American football in Europe. It is a member of the International Federation of American Football. IFAF Europe replaced the European Federation of American Football (EFAF) which had begun in 1976 as the American European Football Federation (AEFF).

IFAF Europe now organises two competitions: the European Championship for male national teams and the European Junior Championship for 16- to 19-year-olds.

After the 2022 Russian invasion of Ukraine, the Italian Federation of American Football (FIDAP; Federazione Italiana Di American Football) announced that the Italian National Team, the then-IFAF Europe title holders, refused to play against Russia in October 2022 in a qualifier for the 2023 IFAF European Championships.

Events
European championship, every four years.
European U-19 Championship, every two years.
European Woman's tackle football championship, every four years.
European Men's flag football championship, every two years.
European Woman's flag football championship, every two years.
Under-15 and Under-17 European Flag football championships (Men and Women), every two years.

Members

Full members

Associate members

Allied members

2022

Europe (28)
 – 1982 
 – 2017 
 – 1996 
 – 1993
 – 1986 
 – 1979
 – 1983
 – 2011
 – 1982
 – 1987
 – 2005 
 – 1984
 – 1997
 – 1980
 – 2018 
 – 2007
 – 1987
 – 1987 
 – 2019 
 – 2012 
 – 2003 
 – ? 
 – 2004 
 – 1994
 – 1985
 – 1982 
 – 2001 
 – 2016

Complete list of members

See also
NFL Europe

References

External links
Official Website

 
International Federation of American Football
Amer